A convenience translation is either when an entity displays its financial statements or other financial information in a currency that is different from either its functional currency or its presentation currency simply by translating all amounts at end-of-period exchange rates. A result of making a convenience translation is that the resulting financial information does not comply with all Generally Accepted Accounting Principles.

It is also referred to as a convenience translation when a (language) translation is rendered for the convenience of reading a text in a different from the original language; however, the original text remains the only legally binding text.

References 

Financial statements